The election for Resident Commissioner to the United States House of Representatives took place on November 3, 1964 the same day as the larger Puerto Rican general election and the United States elections, 1964.

Candidates for Resident Commissioner
 Manuel Iglesias for the Republican Party
 Roberto Lopez-Candal for the Christian Action Party of Puerto Rico
 Jose Antonio Ortiz for the Puerto Rican Independence Party
 Santiago Polanco-Abreu for the Popular Democratic Party

Election results

See also 
Puerto Rican general election, 1964

References 

Puerto Rico
1964